Orbital (also known as Orbital 1 or the Green Album) is the debut studio album by English electronic music duo Orbital, released on 30 September 1991 by FFRR Records. Orbital self-titled their first two albums so the "Green Album" is an unofficial name to distinguish it from the second album. The Mutations EP refers to the album as L.P. C.D. M.C., thus titling the album after the "LP" / "CD" / "MC" on the front cover of the respective format.

Album
The original European release includes live versions of "Chime" and "Midnight".  Orbital was released in 1992 with a significantly different cover and track listing in the United States, incorporating remixes and non-album singles. All tracks on the U.S. release had also been remastered using the Bedini Audio Spectral Enhancer (B.A.S.E.) to enhance their stereophonic effects.

Track listing
All tracks written by Orbital.

United Kingdom and Europe
CD
 "The Moebius" – 7:01
 "Speed Freak" – 7:16
 "Oolaa" – 6:21
 "Desert Storm" – 12:05
 "Fahrenheit 303" – 8:24
 "Steel Cube Idolatry" – 6:34
 "High Rise" – 8:24
 "Chime" (Live) – 5:56
 "Midnight" (Live) – 6:53
 "Belfast" – 8:06
 "I Think It's Disgusting" (Outro) – 0:51

Alternate track listings
Each format (LP, CD and cassette) included a track not included on the others. The unlisted outro track appeared on the CD version only. The double vinyl LP version included a track called "Macro Head" between "Speed Freak" and "Oolaa",  while the cassette included a nine-minute track listed as "Untitled" between "High Rise" and "Chime (Live)". The cover design was modified to identify the format, with the red circle on the LP, CD, and cassette versions including the text LP, CD, and MC respectively. Vinyl pressings had the track listing on the front cover, rather than on the back.

United States
 "Belfast" – 8:06
 "The Moebius" – 7:01
 "Speed Freak" (Moby Remix) – 5:40
 "Fahrenheit 3D3" – 7:04
 "Desert Storm" – 12:05
 "Oolaa" – 6:21
 "Chime" – 8:01
 "Satan" – 6:44
 "Choice" – 5:30
 "Midnight" – 5:08
 "Steel Cube Idolatry" - 6:34 (Cassette bonus not on CD)

Personnel
 Paul Hartnoll – Performer (Orbital)
 Phil Hartnoll  –  Performer (Orbital)
 Orbital – Producer
 Tim Hunt – Engineer
 Herbert Lesch – Assistant Engineer
 Fultano '91 – Sleeve Design

Use in other media
"Belfast" appears on the soundtrack to the film Human Traffic.

References

External links
 
 

Orbital (band) albums
1991 debut albums
FFRR Records albums